Atomic Ivan is a 2012 Russian romantic comedy film directed by Vasily Barkhatov. The first in the history of a feature film, shot at the existing nuclear power plants (Kalinin and Leningrad) with the support of the state corporation Rosatom.

The world premiere took place on 27 September 2011 in London, at the symposium of the World Association of Nuclear Operators. In the Russian rental movie was released on 29 March 2012.

Cast 
Grigoriy Dobrygin as Ivan
Yuliya Snigir  as Tatyana
Yekaterina Vasilyeva as Ivan's grandmother 
 Oleksiy Gorbunov as Ivan's father 
 Marina Golub as neighbor

References

External links
 
 Наконец в безопасности

2012 films
2012 romantic comedy films
Russian romantic comedy films
2010s Russian-language films